Peter Martyr d'Anghiera ( or ab Angleria; ; ; 2 February 1457 – October 1526), formerly known in English as Peter Martyr of Angleria, was an Italian historian at the service of Spain during the Age of Exploration. He wrote the first accounts of explorations in Central and South America in a series of letters and reports, grouped in the original Latin publications of 1511 to 1530 into sets of ten chapters called "decades". His Decades are of great value in the history of geography and discovery. His De Orbe Novo (On the New World, 1530) describes the first contacts of Europeans and Native Americans, Native American civilizations in the Caribbean and North America, as well as Mesoamerica, and includes, for example, the first European reference to India rubber. It was first translated into English in 1555, and in a fuller version in 1912.

Life
Martyr was born on 2 February 1457 at Lake Maggiore in Arona in Piedmont and later named for the nearby city of Angera. He studied under Giovanni Borromeo, then the count of Arona. He went to Rome at the age of twenty and met important men in the hierarchy of the Catholic Church. After meeting the Spanish ambassador in Rome, Martyr accompanied him to Zaragoza in August 1487. Martyr soon became a notable figure among the humanists of Spain. In 1488 he lectured in Salamanca on the invitation of the university. The new learning was supported by highly placed patrons in the society. Martyr would become chaplain to the court of Ferdinand and Isabella.

After 1492, Martyr's chief task was the education of young nobles at the Spanish court. In 1501 he was sent to Egypt on a diplomatic mission to dissuade the Sultan of Egypt from taking vengeance on the Christians in Egypt and Palestine for the defeat of the Moors in Spain and the Fall of Granada. This he achieved by strongly asserting that there were no forced conversions and that Granada Muslims had asked for baptism of their own volition - plus, more importantly, promising Spanish help to Egypt against the threat of conquest by the Ottomans . He described his voyage through Egypt in the Legatio Babylonica, which was published in the 1511 edition of his Decades.  Following the success of this mission, he received the title of maestro de los caballeros (master of knights).

In 1520 Martyr was given the post of chronicler (cronista) in the newly formed Council of the Indies, commissioned by Charles V, Holy Roman Emperor to describe what was occurring in the explorations of the New World. In 1523 Charles gave him the title of Count Palatine, and in 1524 called him once more into the Council of the Indies. Martyr was invested by Pope Clement VII, as proposed by Charles V, as Abbot of Jamaica. Although Martyr never visited the island, as abbot he directed the construction of the first stone church there.

He died in Granada in 1526.

Works

Peter Martyr was a prolific writer. He is estimated to have composed some eight hundred letters addressed to various illustrious persons relating events in Spain and the Spanish court, written in a journalistic style, often quite gossipy. Moving in court circles, Peter Martyr was personally acquainted with most of the leading figures of the day, and it is from his letters that historians have drawn much of the details about their physical appearance, personality, quirks and anecdotes.

It was as a chronicler that Martyr performed his most notable literary work. He collected documents and accounts from the discoverers as well as personally interviewing them. He learned from the letters of Christopher Columbus and made use of the reports of the Council of the Indies. He had a great grasp of geographical issues; he was the first European to realize the significance of the Gulf Stream.

In 1511, his publications included the first historical account of the Spanish discoveries: Opera, Legatio Babylonica, Oceanidecas, Paemata, Epigrammata (Seville, 1511). The Decas consisted of ten reports, two of which Martyr had previously sent as letters describing the voyages of Columbus, to Cardinal Ascanius Sforza in 1493 and 1494. In 1501 Martyr, as requested by the Cardinal Luigi d'Aragona, added eight chapters on the voyage of Columbus and the exploits of Martin Alonzo Pinzón. In 1511 he added a supplement giving an account of events from 1501 to 1511.

Jointly with this Decade, he published a narrative of his experiences in Egypt with a description of the inhabitants, their country, and history. By 1516 he had finished two other Decades:
 The first was devoted to the exploits of Alonso de Ojeda, Diego de Nicuesa, and Vasco Núñez de Balboa
 The second gave an account of Balboa's discovery of the Pacific Ocean, Columbus' fourth voyage, and the expeditions of Pedrarias Dávila.
 Three appeared together at Alcalá de Henares in 1516 under the title: De orbe novo decades cum Legatione Babylonica.
 The Enchiridion de nuper sub D. Carolo repertis insulis (Basle, 1521) was printed as the fourth Decade, describing the voyages of Francisco Hernández de Córdoba, Juan de Grijalva, and Hernán Cortés.
 The fifth Decade (1523) dealt with the conquest of Mexico and the circumnavigation of the world by Ferdinand Magellan.
 The sixth Decade (1524) gave an account of Dávila's discoveries on the west coast of America.
 The seventh Decade (1525) had collected descriptions of the customs of the natives in present-day South Carolina, including the "Testimony of Francisco de Chicora", a Native American taken captive there; as well as those of natives in Florida, Haiti, Cuba, and Darién.
 The eighth Decade (1525) told the story of the march of Cortés against Cristobal de Olid, who attempted to set up an independent state in Honduras.
In 1530 the eight Decades were published together for the first time at Alcalá. Later editions of single or of all the Decades appeared at Basel (1533), Cologne (1574), Paris (1587), and Madrid (1892). A German translation was published in Basle in 1582; an English version may be found in Arber, The first three English books on America (Birmingham, 1885); a French one by Gaffarel in Recueil de voyages et de documents pour servir à l'histoire de la Geographie (Paris, 1907).

Martyr also wrote the historical account, Opus epistolarum, although it was not edited or published until after his death. This collection consists of 812 letters to or from ecclesiastical dignitaries, generals, and statesmen of Spain and Italy, dealing with contemporary events, and especially with the history of Spain between 1487 and 1525. It was published first at Alcalá in 1530; a new edition was issued by the House of Elzevir at Amsterdam in 1670.

Editions
 Peter Martyr d'Anghiera, De orbe novo, translated from the Latin with notes and introduction by Francis Augustus MacNutt, New York: Putnam, 1912. 2 vols.
 Peter Martyr d'Anghiera, Decadas del nuevo mundo, 1944
 Petrus Martyr de Anghieria, Opera: Legatio Babylonica, De Orbe novo decades octo, Opus Epistolarum, Graz: Akademische Druck- U. Verlagsanstalt, 1966

References

Further reading
 
 
 
 
 Nugent, Elizabeth M. (1969) "Peter Martyr D’Anghiera." in The Thought & Culture of the English Renaissance. Springer, Netherlands. pp. 511–518.

External links
 
 

Italian diplomats
16th-century Italian historians
Spanish diplomats
16th-century Spanish historians
16th-century Mesoamericanists
Italian chroniclers
Spanish chroniclers
Spanish exploration in the Age of Discovery
1457 births
1526 deaths
Historians of Mesoamerica
Italian Mesoamericanists
People from Arona, Piedmont
People of the Colony of Santo Domingo
16th-century Latin-language writers